Jorge António Rosa Casquilha (born 13 January 1969) is a Portuguese former footballer who played as an attacking midfielder, currently manager of C.D. Trofense.

Playing career
Born in Torres Novas, Santarém District, Casquilha played 19 years as a senior. He started out at local Clube Desportivo Torres Novas, then alternated between the second and third divisions the following seasons.

Casquilha made his debut in the Primeira Liga in the 1999–2000 campaign, aged already 30. Alongside future S.L. Benfica and Portugal star Petit, he was an essential midfield unit for Gil Vicente F.C. who finished in a best-ever fifth position, scoring three goals in 32 games.

After helping the Barcelos club always retain its league status, and having amassed Portuguese top-flight totals of 177 matches and 11 goals, the 36-year-old Casquilha left and signed for S.C. Espinho in the third tier, following which he retired.

Coaching career
Casquilha began coaching in 2006, immediately after retiring. He started with amateurs Santa Maria FC, which he guided to the second place in the AF Braga regional championships. In quick succession, he then worked with Merelinense F.C. and C.A. Valdevez, guiding the latter to the last 16 in the Taça de Portugal in 2007–08.

In summer 2009, Casquilha was appointed at Moreirense FC. He achieved promotions in 2010 and 2012, the latter signifying a return to the top division after an absence of seven years.

On 30 January 2013, after only one win in the first 16 league games of the season, Casquilha was relieved of his duties. Highlights included, however, a 3–2 home win over Sporting CP in the domestic cup after extra time.

On 6 March 2014, Casquilha signed a deal with second division side Leixões S.C. until the end of the campaign. On 30 April, however, he was suspended due to comments he made in an interview which were regarded as inappropriate and detrimental to the club's name and history.

Casquilha returned to management in December 2014, taking over at U.D. Leiria in the third tier. He was dismissed in March 2016, after failing with the board's aim to win promotion.

Still in March 2016, Casquilha returned to division two with Académico de Viseu F.C. as their third manager of the campaign. In January 2017, he was hired at C.F. União in the same league.

Casquilha moved to his former club Gil Vicente on 26 May 2017. He left on 28 December, as they were placed 15th in the standings.

Halfway through 2018–19, Casquilha rejoined Leixões after the dismissal of Filipe Gouveia. After taking the team to seventh place, he left at the end of his contract for C.D. Cova da Piedade in the same league. He quit on 15 December, with the side last-placed with seven points.

Casquilha was appointed at second-division C.D. Trofense in November 2022.

Managerial statistics

References

External links

1969 births
Living people
People from Torres Novas
Sportspeople from Santarém District
Portuguese footballers
Association football midfielders
Primeira Liga players
Liga Portugal 2 players
Segunda Divisão players
U.R. Mirense players
Associação Académica de Coimbra – O.A.F. players
Amora F.C. players
C.D. Feirense players
Gil Vicente F.C. players
S.C. Espinho players
Portuguese football managers
Primeira Liga managers
Liga Portugal 2 managers
Merelinense F.C. managers
Moreirense F.C. managers
Leixões S.C. managers
U.D. Leiria managers
Académico de Viseu F.C. managers
Gil Vicente F.C. managers
C.D. Trofense managers